"The One with the Monkey" is the tenth episode of the NBC television series Friends. It is the tenth episode of the show's first season and was broadcast on December 15, 1994. This episode marks the first appearance of Marcel, a monkey that Ross (David Schwimmer) adopts to keep him company. Phoebe (Lisa Kudrow) meets scientist David, though their relationship is short-lived, when David gets a grant to work in Minsk. The gang all make a no-date pact for their New Year's Eve party, though they all end up breaking it, with undesired consequences.

Plot
In order to curb his loneliness after his divorce, Ross adopts a capuchin monkey named Marcel. Things start off on rocky footing – Marcel seems rebellious and unwilling to listen to Ross. However, Chandler bonds with him almost immediately. With New Year's fast approaching, Chandler proposes that the gang make a no-date pact and have dinner together on New Year's Eve, which everyone agrees to.

Phoebe sings 13 new songs she has written – all of them about her mother's suicide. During her set, she is interrupted by two scientists arguing over her performance. She goes to confront them, and finds out that one of them – David (Hank Azaria) – thinks that she is the most beautiful woman he has ever seen even though his partner, Max, begs to differ. Phoebe and David begin dating and she asks Chandler for permission to break the no-date pact for New Year's. He agrees as he has already asked Janice, having snapped at the thought of being alone despite how annoying she is.

As the days pass, Monica plans on bringing her ex-boyfriend Fun Bobby, Rachel learns that Paolo will catch an earlier flight back to the US from Italy for New Year's, and Joey invites Sandy, a single mom he meets while working as one of Santa's elves at the mall. When Ross objects to all his friends breaking their no-date pact, Rachel suggests turning their New Year's dinner into a New Year's party to compensate so no one knows who is with whom. Max arrives and tells Phoebe that he and David have gotten a grant to study in Minsk for three years, and will be leaving on New Year's Day. When she goes to congratulate David, he and Max inform her that he has rejected the  opportunity to go, wishing to stay in New York with her.

The six friends end up keeping their no-date pact after all: Ross arrives at the party with only Marcel. Paolo has missed his flight, and Rachel gets attacked outside of the airport by a woman who thinks Rachel has stolen her cab. Max informs David that he is leaving for Minsk alone, and Phoebe convinces him to go with him, telling him he cannot stay just for her. Fun Bobby is depressed because his grandfather has just died, and makes the party even more depressing. Sandy not only brings her kids to the party, but she hooks up with Max. Chandler tries to tell Janice that he only invited her for New Year's, but she gets upset at him and storms off.

At midnight, Phoebe is too sad to kiss anyone, Rachel's lip was cut in the attack so she cannot kiss anyone, and Monica does not feel like kissing anybody. Chandler demands someone kiss him anyway – so Joey obliges.

Reception 
Entertainment Weekly gave the episode a B, saying the episode introduces the monkey that was "perhaps Friends biggest blunder – forcing Schwimmer to do comedy opposite a simian is beneath him." The episode "illustrates the writer' tendency to overplot" (such as having Rachel get into a catfight at the airport), "and the multiple story lines never quite jell. Still, any ep that gives Phoebe center stage gets bumped up a grade."

Sam Ashurst from Digital Spy ranked it #120 on their ranking of the 236 Friends episodes, and called it a "strong, early episode".

Telegraph & Argus wrote that the show stealer was Chandler's line "You don't have to face the horrible pressures of this holiday: desperate scramble to find anything with lips just so you can have someone to kiss when the ball drops!! Man, I'm talking loud!"

Distractify ranked it the number one Friends Christmas episode.

References

External links 
 

Friends (season 1) episodes
1994 American television episodes
Television episodes about mammals